Michael Andrew Minovitch (born c. 1936) is an American mathematician who developed gravity assist technique when he was a UCLA graduate student and working summers at NASA's Jet Propulsion Laboratory.

In 1961 Minovitch began using the fastest available computer at the time, the IBM 7090, to solve the three-body problem. He ran simulations and developed his own solution by 1962.

The first mission to use a gravity assist was Pioneer 10, which increased its velocity from 52,000 km/h to 132,000 km/h as it passed by Jupiter in December, 1973.

Minovitch patented a vehicle for space travel under the patent title Magnetic propulsion system and operating method, US Patent 6193194 B1.

References

External links 

Jupiter swing-by trajectories passing near the earth  Includes comprehensive history of the development of gravity-assist trajectories.

Gravity-assist "Slingshot", Background, principle, applications, Part 1 and 2 on EEWorldOnline.com

20th-century American mathematicians
21st-century American mathematicians
1930s births
Living people
University of California, Los Angeles alumni
University of California, Berkeley alumni